Birmingham Selly Oak is a constituency in the West Midlands, represented in the House of Commons of the UK Parliament since 2010 by Steve McCabe of the Labour Party.

Members of Parliament

Boundaries

2010–present: The City of Birmingham wards of Billesley, Bournville, Brandwood, and Selly Oak.

1983–2010: The City of Birmingham wards of Bournville, King's Norton, Moseley, and Selly Oak.

1974–1983: The County Borough of Birmingham wards of King's Norton, Moseley, and Selly Oak.

1955–1974: The County Borough of Birmingham wards of Balsall Heath, Moseley and King's Heath, and Selly Oak.

The seat includes many students and staff from the nearby University of Birmingham. Half of the university's Selly Oak campus is located within the constituency. The Cadbury factory and Cadbury World are also within its boundaries.

History
Since its creation in 1955 the seat has switched hands three times between Labour and the Conservatives. The seat has progressively swung towards Labour from being a safe Conservative seat; this has been attributed to housing redevelopments that took place in the 1960s and 1970s. More recently, it has acquired a reputation for electing outspoken MPs, first with the victory of Anthony Beaumont-Dark of the Conservatives in 1979, and then with his defeat by Lynne Jones of the Labour Party in 1992.

Elections

Elections in the 2010s

Elections in the 2000s

Elections in the 1990s

Elections in the 1980s

Elections in the 1970s

Elections in the 1960s

Elections in the 1950s

See also
List of parliamentary constituencies in the West Midlands (county)

Notes

References

External links 
 Birmingham city council constituency page

Parliamentary constituencies in Birmingham, West Midlands
Constituencies of the Parliament of the United Kingdom established in 1955
Selly Oak